Gang Beasts is a beat 'em up party game developed and published by British indie studio Boneloaf. The title would originally be published by Double Fine Presents until May 2020 and self-published afterwards, while it would later be published in physical form by Skybound Games The game released for Microsoft Windows, macOS, Linux, and PlayStation 4 on 12 December 2017, following an early access period for the PC platforms that began in August 2014. It was also released on the Xbox One on 27 March 2019.

Gameplay 
Gang Beasts is a multiplayer beat 'em up party game with gelatinous and floppy characters, melee fight sequences, and hazardous environments, set in the fictional metropolis of Beef City. At initial release, it contained eight multiplayer stages, and costume customization. The core gameplay involves using various physical abilities such as punching or kicking an opponent until they are knocked out, and then attempting to toss them over one of the stage hazards. Opponents that have been knocked down are not completely defenseless however, as they can fight back to be released.

Customizability 
Gang beasts includes a variety of absurd and hilarious customizable options for their character, ranging from a fireman suit with a top hat, to a bear suit with flip flops on. While the custom options do not affect gameplay, the possibilities for character customization is endless in this action packed party game.

Reception 

Already in its freeware alpha state, as well as upon Steam Early Access release, the game was met with positive response from critics and fans. Comments include Keith Stuart of The Guardian calling it "probably one of the silliest beat-'em-ups ever made," Jessica Conditt from Engadget calling it "a jolly good time", and Steve Hansen from Destructoid highlighting how its weirdness plays out well.

Outside of early access, Gang Beasts received mixed reviews from critics on both the PC and PlayStation 4 versions of the game. On Metacritic, the game holds a score of 67/100 for the PlayStation 4 version based on 8 reviews, indicating "mixed or average reviews".

The game was nominated for "Excellence in Multiplayer" at the 2018 SXSW Gaming Awards, and for "Multiplayer" at the 14th British Academy Games Awards.

References

External links 
 

Double Fine games
Indie video games
Linux games
MacOS games
Party video games
PlayStation 4 games
PlayStation VR games
2017 video games
Video games developed in the United Kingdom
Windows games
Early access video games
3D beat 'em ups
Xbox One games